Bahujana sukhaya bahujana hitaya (translates to "for the happiness of the many, for the welfare of the many") is a dictum or aphorism.

Hinduism defines five basic traditional philosophical concepts and the fifth concept enjoined to be followed is the concept of "welfare of the many, the happiness of the many". 

Gautama Buddha in the fifth century B.C. suggested his disciples to work for the welfare and happiness of the masses. Numerous others such as the nineteenth-century monk Swami Vivekananda and Indian nationalist, Sri Aurobindo also spoke on this aphorism.

This aphorism is the motto of the All India Radio (AIR) a National Public Service Broadcaster and its emblem depicts the motto.

Explanation

In Hinduism
Hinduism defines five basic traditional philosophical concepts and the fifth concept enjoined to be followed is the concept of “welfare of the many, the happiness of the many. The tenet's basic approach is for the good of the entire human race. Vivekananda also stressed this aspect as a message for mankind.

In Buddhism 
Gautama Buddha after he attained self-realization gave sermons to his disciples. The first sermon that he delivered to his five disciples  was Dhamma Chakka Pavattana Sutta meaning “the turning of the wheel of Dharma” which was further interpreted as bahujana hitAya-bahujana sukhaya. For Buddha, according to this dictum, excessive luxury and excessive work were both to be shunned in order to achieve welfare and prosperity among human beings. As these two approaches cannot be put to practice, it was essential to adopt mujjhima patipada meaning a middle course to usher welfare and progress in life. This sermon formed the core of the seed of the tree which emerged as “Buddhism with its several branches  containing flowers and fruits full of enlightenment.”

Vivekananda's view
Vivekananda for the purpose of providing an aesthetic vision to this aphorism said that the Brahman, the enlightened, never seeks fruits or happiness for his action but works for the welfare of others. He also observed that a “socio-aesthetic worker” aims to usher a distinctive change in the society to derive the benefit of a life of beauty and order. He emphasized that a realization of “valiant aesthetic force in the society" was essential through Mahashakti (divine force).

All India Radio's motto
Akashavani, meaning "celestial voice", is the All India Radio (AIR), a National Public Service Broadcaster  which was established in 1930 with the motto ‘Bahujan Hitaya : Bahujan Sukhaya’. Living up to this motto, AIR has been serving the nation's masses in the fields of education, information and entertainment; it is one of the largest institutions in the world. The emblem of AIR is inscribed with the word Akashvani at its base and with its motto on its flanks.

References

Bibliography 
 
 

Swami Vivekananda
Gautama Buddha